This is a sortable list of townlands of County Clare, Ireland.

Duplicate names occur where there is more than one townland with the same name in the county. Names marked in bold typeface are towns, and the word Town appears for those entries in the Acres column.

Townland list

See also

List of civil parishes of County Clare

References

 
Clare
Clare
Townlands